Arethusa is an academic journal established in 1967. It covers the field of Classics using an interdisciplinary approach incorporating contemporary theoretical perspectives and more traditional approaches to literary and material evidence. It frequently features issues focused on a theme related the classical world. The current Editor in chief of the journal is Roger D. Woodard (SUNY Buffalo). The journal is named for the mythical nymph Arethusa and  published three times each year in January, May, and September by the Johns Hopkins University Press.

External links 
 
 Arethusa  at Project MUSE

Classics journals
Johns Hopkins University Press academic journals
English-language journals
Publications established in 1967
Triannual journals